Useless may refer to:

 Useless (film), a 2007 Chinese documentary by Jia Zhangke
 Useless (EP), a 2000 EP by Unloco
 "Useless" (song), a 1997 song by Depeche Mode
 "Useless", a 2009 song by Cavo from Bright Nights Dark Days
 "Useless", a song by Faster Pussycat from The Power and the Glory Hole
 "Useless", a song by Myka Relocate from Lies to Light the Way
 "Useless (I Don't Need You Now)", a song by Kym Mazelle
 "Inútil" ("Useless"), a song from the musical In the Heights

See also